Gerard McSorley (Irish:  Gearóid Mac Somhairle; born 1 January 1950) is an Irish theatre, television and film actor.

Early life

He was born in the County Tyrone town of Omagh and, after attending a Christian Brothers school in his hometown, he attended St. Columb's College in Derry. He then attended Queen's University, Belfast, where he was taught by Seamus Heaney. He resides in Gweedore, County Donegal. He is a descendant of John McSorley, who opened McSorley's Old Ale House, the oldest operating pub in New York City.

Career
He spent much of his early career working in theatre, notably at the Abbey Theatre in Dublin. After playing Michael Evans in the original West End and Broadway productions of Brian Friel's play Dancing at Lughnasa in the early 1990s, McSorley started to attract more TV and movie roles. He has appeared in many Hollywood movies including Braveheart (in which his character "Cheltham" was decapitated by William Wallace at the battle of Stirling) and In the Name of the Father. One of his most celebrated performances was his lead role in Omagh, a feature-length television drama depicting the effect of the Omagh bombing on the residents of the town. He is also known for playing the mysterious "Father Todd Unctious" in the Christmas special episode ("A Christmassy Ted") of the Channel 4 sitcom Father Ted. His film credits include The Constant Gardener, and he was also cast as Queenan in The Departed but had to pull out (Martin Sheen took over the role). McSorley most recently played the role of Robert Aske in the Showtime historical drama The Tudors. He appeared in the 2010 movie Robin Hood, directed by Ridley Scott and starring Russell Crowe.

Legal issues
In November 2019, McSorley was arrested for a breach of the peace. He was also charged with damaging property in a cell at Letterkenny Garda Station. A warrant was issued for his arrest the following month after he failed to appear in court.

Filmography

Film

 SOS Titanic (1979, TV Movie) – Martin Gallagher
 Angel (1982) – Assistant
 Withdrawal (1982, Short) – Gerry
 Taffin (1988) – Ed
 In the Name of the Father (1993) – Detective Pavis
 Widows' Peak (1994) – Gaffney, Lawyer
 Moondance (1994) – Fr. McGrath
 Words Upon the Window Pane (1994) – Abraham Johnson
 An Awfully Big Adventure (1995) – George
 Braveheart (1995) – Cheltham
 Nothing Personal (1995) – Cecil
 Michael Collins (1996) – Cathal Brugha
 Some Mother's Son (1996) – Fr. Daly
 The Serpent's Kiss (1997) – Mr. Galmoy
 The Butcher Boy (1997) – Psychiatrist #2
 The Boxer (1997) – Harry
 Dancing at Lughnasa (1998) – Narrator (voice)
 Felicia's Journey (1999) – Felicia's Father
 Agnes Browne (1999) – Mr. Aherne
 Angela's Ashes (1999) – Father Gregory
 Ordinary Decent Criminal (2000) – Harrison
 On The Edge (2001) – Rachel's Father
 Do Armed Robbers Have Love Affairs? (2001, Short) – Eddy
 Bloody Sunday (2002) – Chief Supt. Lagan
 The Wayfarer (2003, Short) – Nat
 Dead Bodies (2003) – Gordon Ellis
 Veronica Guerin (2003, Nominated for a 2003 Irish Film and Television Award for Best Supporting Actor) – John Gilligan
 The Halo Effect (2004) – O'Grady
 Omagh (2004, TV Movie, Won a 2004 Irish Film and Television Award for Best Actor) – Michael Gallagher
 Inside I'm Dancing (2004) – Fergus Connolly
 The Constant Gardener (2005) –  Sir Kenneth Curtiss
 Middletown (2006, Nominated for a 2007 Irish Film and Television Award for Best Supporting Actor) – Bill Hunter
 The Front Line (2006) – Detective Insp. Harbison
 Tell It to the Fishes (2006, Short) – Jack
 The Tudors (2007) – Robert Aske
 Hesitation (2007, Short) – Paul
 Anton (2008, Nominated for a 2009 Irish Film and Television Award for Best Supporting Actor) – Detective Lynch
 Mr Crocodile in the Cupboard (2008, Short) – Harry Dunn
 Rip & the Preacher (2008) – Preacher
 Wide Open Spaces (2009) – Hingerty
 Swansong: Story of Occi Byrne (2009) – Michael Byrne
 Town Creek (2009) – Mr. Marshall
 Robin Hood (2010) – Baron Fitzrobert
 War Horse (2011) – Market Auctioneer
 Bayonet (2012, Short) – Sean O'Brennan
 In View (2016)
 Lift (2016) – Granddad Eddy
 Penance (2018) – Murray

TV roles 
 Play for Tomorrow (1982) – John Bingham
 The Irish R.M. (1984) – Thomay Foley
 Bergerac (1985) – Doctor
 Lapsed Catholics (1987) – Mal Nevin
 The Rockingham Shoot (1987) – Garda Casey
 Act of Betrayal (1988) – Brendon
 The Investigation: Inside a Terrorist Bombing (1990) – Paddy Mcllkenny
 Shakespeare: The Animated Tales (1994) – Iago
 The Hanging Gale (1995) – Coulter
 The Governor (1995) – Harry Reynolds
 Kidnapped (1995) – Shuan
 Runway One (1995) – Manning
 A Christmassy Ted (1996) – Father Todd Unctious
 Making the Cut (1998)
 Vicious Circle (1999) – Crowley
 Teenage Cics (2006) – Principal Scannel
 Damage (2007) – Defence Counsel
 Striapacha (2008)
 The Tudors (2009) – Robert Aske
 The Savage Eye (2009) – Various

References

External links
 

1950 births
Alumni of Queen's University Belfast
Living people
Irish male film actors
Irish male television actors
Male film actors from Northern Ireland
Male television actors from Northern Ireland
People from Omagh
People educated at St Columb's College
People educated at Christian Brothers Grammar School, Omagh